Elachista maboulella is a moth in the family Elachistidae. It was described by Pierre Chrétien in 1915. It is found in Algeria and Spain.

References

Moths described in 1915
maboulella
Moths of Africa
Moths of Europe